Gurgaon Lok Sabha constituency is one of the 10 Lok Sabha (parliamentary) constituencies in Haryana state in northern India. This constituency was in existence from 1952-77. It came into existence again in 2008 as a part of the implementation of the recommendations of the Delimitation Commission of India constituted in 2002. This constituency was created by merging five assembly segments of erstwhile Mahendragarh constituency with four assembly segments of erstwhile Faridabad constituency.

Assembly segments
At present, Gurgaon Lok Sabha constituency comprises nine Vidhan Sabha (legislative assembly) constituencies. These are:

Members of Parliament
The Gurgaon Lok Sabha constituency was created in 1952. The list of Member of Parliament (MP) is as follows:

Election results

See also
 Gurgaon district
 Mahendragarh (Lok Sabha constituency)
 List of Constituencies of the Lok Sabha

Notes

Lok Sabha constituencies in Haryana
Gurgaon district